Ambrogetti is an Italian surname.

Notable people with the name include:
 Alessio Ambrogetti (born 1989), Italian footballer 
 Francesca Ambrogetti, a member of the Italian Agenzia Nazionale Stampa Associata 
 Giuseppe Ambrogetti (1780 - after 1838), Italian opera singer

Italian-language surnames
Patronymic surnames
Surnames from given names